The Cathedral of Talin is a seventh-century Armenian cathedral located in the cemetery of Talin, in the Aragatsotn Province of Armenia.

Talin Cathedral

Architecture 
Talin's Katoghike Church sits central to the town cemetery and dominates the surrounding landscape. It is assumed to have been constructed during the late 7th century based on the architectural style. The building is currently in ruin, where the dome and a significant portion of the western wing have since collapsed. There is a dodecagonal drum that is centrally positioned over the structure. Two prayer rooms or "studies" are positioned adjacent to and at either side of the apse. Each room contains a secret passage entrance at the second story level, facing the direction of the apse. The small passage allegedly leads to small rooms above.

The apse contains the remnants of numerous portraits of the Apostles painted as frescoes around the semi-dome above.

Kamsarakan S. Astvatsatsin Church

Architecture 

The church of S. Astvatsatsin is situated adjacent to the entrance of the cemetery and monastic complex at Talin and near the main cathedral. It is a small cruciform central-planned building with a Byzantine-style single red tile, octagonal umbrella domed roof that is centered over the church. The dome sits above an octagonal drum that is pierced by four small windows. A decorative geometric projecting cornice trims the dome and gable roof. There is a single entrance to the building from the western façade, with an inscription written upon the half-rounded tympanum above. The inscription attests to a construction date in the 7th century. It reads the following passage:

There are two Nersehs that are noted to have ruled as governor; one during the reign of Byzantine Emperor Heraclius in 639, and another during that of Byzantine Emperor Justinian II in 689. Its construction has been attributed to Prince Nerseh Kamsarakan who commissioned the church during the 7th century; a time when the Kamsarakan family ruled over the region surrounding Talin.

Gallery

References

External links 

 About Cathedral of Talin
 Armeniapedia: Talin Cathedral
 Rensselear Digital Collection: Talin Cathedral
 Program about Cathedral of Talin by Vem Radio

Armenian Apostolic cathedrals in Armenia
Destroyed churches
Oriental Orthodox congregations established in the 7th century
Churches in Aragatsotn Province
Tourist attractions in Aragatsotn Province
Armenian Apostolic cathedrals
7th-century churches in Armenia